Samus is a rural locality (a settlement) under the administrative jurisdiction of Seversk City Under Oblast Jurisdiction in Tomsk Oblast, Russia, located on the Tom River,  north of Seversk proper. Population:

References

Rural localities in Tomsk Oblast
Renamed localities of Tomsk Oblast